Lyuben Obretenov (1 July 1918 – 2 May 2011) was a Bulgarian gymnast. He competed in eight events at the 1936 Summer Olympics.

References

1918 births
2011 deaths
Bulgarian male artistic gymnasts
Olympic gymnasts of Bulgaria
Gymnasts at the 1936 Summer Olympics
Place of birth missing